Przybyszów may refer to the following places:
Przybyszów, Łódź Voivodeship (central Poland)
Przybyszów, Subcarpathian Voivodeship (south-east Poland)
Przybyszów, Świętokrzyskie Voivodeship (south-central Poland)
Przybyszów, Greater Poland Voivodeship (west-central Poland)
Przybyszów, Lubusz Voivodeship (west Poland)